The Smiths were an English rock band from 1982 to 1987. This is a chronological list of their known live performances.

Tour dates

Footnotes

References

The Smiths
Smiths